Minuscule 437 (in the Gregory-Aland numbering), Απρ12 (in the Soden numbering), is a Greek minuscule manuscript of the New Testament, on parchment. Palaeographically it has been assigned to the 11th century.

Description 

The codex contains only the text of the Acts of the Apostles on 257 parchment leaves with a catena. The text is written in one column per page, in 24 lines per page.

Text 
Aland did not place the Greek text of the codex in any Category.

History 

Scrivener dated the manuscript to the 12th century, Gregory dated it to the 11th century.

The manuscript was added to the list of the New Testament manuscripts by Scholz (1794-1852).

The manuscript was examined by Birch and Scholz. It was designated by 74a. C. R. Gregory saw it in 1886.

It is currently housed at the Vatican Library (Vat. gr. 760) in Rome.

See also 

 List of New Testament minuscules
 Biblical manuscript
 Textual criticism

References

Further reading

External links 
 

Greek New Testament minuscules
11th-century biblical manuscripts
Manuscripts of the Vatican Library